Heathland School is an independent school situated in Accrington, Lancashire in England. The school accepts children from the age of three months in the nursery area, up to the age of sixteen.

Departments 
The school is split into four "departments".
 Baby Unit - Children from the age of three months to two years
 Nursery - Children from the age of two years to four years
 Junior School - Children from the age of four years to eleven years. Key Stages One and Two are studied.
 Senior School - Children from the age of eleven years to sixteen years. Key Stage Three and GCSEs are studied.

School building 
The school was built in 1802 as an all-girls school. In 1889 the old school building was demolished. A new home was built in 1900 by Sir George Watson MacAlpine. The surrounding gardens were designed by T. H. Mawson. This was later used as a rest home for the elderly.

Curriculum 
Both the junior and senior school study Mathematics, English, Science, History, Geography, French, Music, IT, PE and Art and Design. Most of these subjects can also be taken at GCSE.

References

External links
School website

Private schools in Lancashire
Schools in Hyndburn